The trilling tailorbird or  green-backed tailorbird (Orthotomus chloronotus) is a species of bird formerly placed in the "Old World warbler" assemblage, but now placed in the family Cisticolidae. The bird is endemic to the northern Philippines.

Its natural habitats are tropical moist lowland forests and tropical mangrove forests.

References

trilling tailorbird
Birds of Luzon
trilling tailorbird